Marianne Cornetti (born 1962) is an American operatic mezzo-soprano.

Early life
Cornetti grew up in Cabot, Pennsylvania, a town north of Pittsburgh, to Irish mother and Italian father. Four generations of women in her maternal family had high musical abilities though none of them were formally trained. Although raised Catholic and practicing, she sang in the choir of St. Mary of the Assumption Catholic Church in Herman alongside local churches of other denominations.

Her talent was discovered in her sixth grade, when a chorus teacher invited her to sing a solo. She sang "I'd Like to Teach the World to Sing" and was then recommended to the high school choir director. Since eighth grade, she had four years of private voice lessons before attending college. After graduating from Knoch High School in 1981, she was enrolled into the Manhattan School of Music. Due to poor experience she transferred to College-Conservatory of Music in Cincinnati. A thyroid problem then developed in her sophomore year, forcing her to suspend her studies. After a year's treatment she lost self-confidence and gave up returning in her midway to school.

Considering her strengths in music and human services, she switched major into speech pathology and attended Penn State University. Disliking the academic subjects, she transferred one year later to Duquesne University in Pittsburgh, which was reputed in her field of studies. An administrator there suggested that she could do double major and finish the music degree considering her credits, but she in fact had to choose one. After two months, having regained the passion in singing, she admitted her perplexity to her voice teacher Mija Novich, a dramatic soprano, who in turn told her, "If you don't sing, it will haunt you for the rest of your life." She had committed to music ever since.

Career 
After her studies, Cornetti spent three years in the Young Artists Program of Pittsburgh Opera, where she made her first stage appearance as First maid in Strauss' Elektra in 1989. She made her Metropolitan Opera debut at the end of 1993, as the Russian Nanny in Death in Venice. In New York, she had private studies with Dodi Protero, with whom she worked on the bigger roles for about ten years. She sang her first major role in 1995 at the Atlanta Opera, where she was originally going to sing Fenena in Nabucco but switched instead to Azucena in Il trovatore. After the performance, she was engaged by Hawaii Opera Theatre to sing Amneris in Aida in 1997, which led to further recognition in major roles. She finally left the Met in 1998 after five years of exclusively small roles, the last being Mamma Lucia in Cavalleria rusticana.

Cornetti was appointed Artistic Director of Pittsburgh Festival Opera in November 2019.
She is also on the Voice Faculty at Carnegie Mellon University.

Cornetti lives in Pittsburgh. She formerly resided in New Kensington for nine years.

References

External links
 
 Marianne Cornetti at Athlone Artists
 

1962 births
Living people
People from Butler County, Pennsylvania
Musicians from Pittsburgh
Classical musicians from Pennsylvania
American operatic mezzo-sopranos
20th-century American women opera singers
21st-century American women opera singers
Duquesne University alumni
American people of Irish descent
American people of Italian descent
Carnegie Mellon University faculty